Jerry Seuseu (born 19 April 1974) is a New Zealand former professional rugby league footballer who played in the 1990s and 2000s, as a . He represented New Zealand and Samoa at international level. After retirement he became Wellbeing and Education manager at the New Zealand Warriors, and the manager for the Junior Warriors. He is the current Junior Kiwis Manager as well as the Senior Wellbeing Manager for the New Zealand Warriors

Playing career
A Mangere East Hawks junior, Seuseu represented the Counties Manukau Heroes in the Lion Red Cup in 1995 and 1996, where he was Lion Red Cup player of the year in 1996 before joining the Auckland Warriors where he was named Reserve Grader of the Year in 1997.  Seuseu then became a stalwart in the Auckland Warriors front row after Joe Vagana left the club to join Bradford Bulls in 2000. Seuseu played for Samoa at the 2000 World Cup. Seuseu played for the New Zealand Warriors at prop forward in their 2002 NRL Grand Final loss against the Sydney Roosters. He went on to make over 120 appearances for the New Zealand Warriors, scoring 8 tries.

In 2004 he was banned for seven matches after pleading guilty to reckless high tackling.

Seuseu joined English club Wigan Warriors at the start of the 2005 Super League season. His younger brother, Anthony Seuseu, also played in Super League VIII with strugglers Halifax. Seuseu retired from rugby league at the end of the 2006 Super League season after two years playing for Wigan Warriors.

Post playing
Between 2007 and 2009 he worked as a Football Development Officer for the Auckland Rugby League focusing on grassroots juniors. He then took up a similar position at the New Zealand Warriors, becoming the Welfare and Education manager for the 2010 season.

References

External links
Wigan Warriors profile

1974 births
Living people
New Zealand sportspeople of Samoan descent
Rugby league players from Auckland
New Zealand rugby league players
New Zealand national rugby league team players
New Zealand Warriors players
Wigan Warriors players
Counties Manukau rugby league team players
Mangere East Hawks players
Rugby league props
Samoa national rugby league team players
New Zealand rugby league administrators